"The Pilot" is the first single from Double Experience's third studio album Rock (Geology), officially released on November 14, 2017.

Background

On October 5, 2017, Double Experience's official Facebook page announced their new single and its release date. The band later announced a launch party in Ottawa to celebrate the song's release.

Music video
Double Experience released a music video for "The Pilot" on November 9, 2017.

Track listing

Release history

References

External links

2017 singles
2017 songs
Double Experience songs